Resilience is the fifth studio album by American rock band Drowning Pool. It was released on April 9, 2013, and is the first Drowning Pool album recorded with vocalist Jasen Moreno. The album was also made available for download from iTunes and in MP3 format on Amazon.

Style and themes
The album features a much more aggressive and anthemic sound than their previous material. It is primarily an alternative metal and hard rock album, but with hints of post-grunge. Its lyrical themes include partying ("Saturday Night"), confrontation, resistance, anger ("One Finger and a Fist") and other similar themes.

Singles
Three singles have been released from the album so far. The first single, "In Memory Of..." was dedicated to their original vocalist Dave Williams and was released August 14, 2012, on the 10th anniversary of his death. The next single, "Saturday Night" was released on November 13, 2012. the third, "One Finger and a Fist", was released on January 29, 2013.

Production and background
The album was recorded at the House of Loud Studios in New Jersey and it was then finished up in Dallas. The album was also produced by Kato Khandwalla. In a post on the band's official Facebook page, guitarist C.J. Pierce wrote, 

In an interview in September 2012 with Guitar World, Jasen Moreno said

Critical reception

Resilience has received mixed reviews. Revolver magazine criticized "One Finger and a Fist" for being "full of unconvincing declarations of being "hardcore", and "Saturday Night" for being "an awkward attempt at a party song" but described "Anytime Anyplace", "Life of Misery" and "Broken Again" as songs that "blow through the front door like an angry bull." Metal Storm described Jasen as a worthy replacement for Ryan McCombs, as well as describing "Life of Misery" as the album's strongest track. Shyam Rajdev from Sound and Motion was very positive towards the album and describes its solos as "incredible" and regards Jasen Moreno's vocals as the highlight of the album.

Track listing

Personnel 
 Jasen Moreno – lead vocals
 C.J. Pierce – guitar
 Stevie Benton – bass guitar
 Mike Luce – drums

Additional
 John Feldmann – production, mixing and composing
 Kato Khandwalla – production and engineering
 Marie D'Antonio – management
 Allen Kovac – management
 Dan Korneff – mixing
 Fred Kevorkian – mastering
 David Jackson – cover art and photography
 Tommy English – additional production, mixing and engineering
 Trevor Niemann – design

References

2013 albums
Drowning Pool albums
Eleven Seven Label Group albums
Albums produced by John Feldmann